Juno Baby was a multiple Emmy Award winning line of children’s educational-development products that blend original music with puppet characters. The product line focuses around the characters of Juno, a six-year-old girl with a natural passion for music,  her two-year-old brother Rai Rai, and several animal companions. The company has two brands: Juno Baby which is geared toward the toddler and infant market and Juno Jr. and the world of Harmonia Springs which focuses on pre-school aged children. who composed Turner Classic Movies' Cartoon Alley.

The brand was founded by Belinda Takahashi PhD, a professional composer, professor and Adam Adelman in 2003 after the two found themselves disappointed by the lack of music-focused children’s educational material. They officially launched the brand in 2004, and won more awards than any other children's media company in the country.   The following year, the company expanded its line of DVDs and CDs to include toys, books, and apparel.  The company's first book, Juno's Musical ABCs, was narrated by Brooke Shields.   Juno Baby signed a partnership deal with FAO Schwarz with the announcement of their pre-school brand, Juno Jr. along with other retailers such as Buy Buy Baby and Toys "R" Us.  In June 2010 the company launched their One For All program, which donates one of their products to the Head Start Program for every Juno Baby product purchased. and signed a licensing deal with Cookie Jar Entertainment's licensing arm, CPLG and a television partnership with CCI to broadcast the Juno Jr. series.

Characters
Juno: The titular character who is a little girl wearing a red dress with the initial "J" on it. Her catchphrase is "Buglebugs! and she waves the baton." Voiced by Belinda Takahashi and puppeteered by
Rai Rai: Juno's little brother who is a baby wearing a diaper and a blanket tied around his neck resembling a cape and he plays the xylophone and a triangle. He does not speak complete sentences in his baby voice. Portrayed by Raiden Adelman, the son of Takahashi and Adelman and the puppeteer by
Indie: A cat who is friends with Juno. "A charming companion, excellent at crossword puzzles, played the french horn and prefers warm milk and cookies at teatime." Voiced by Adam Adelman and puppeteered by Brett O'Quinn.
Bunny - A bunny who is pink, wears a necklace, and has a hair clip on one of her ears and she plays the violin. Voiced by Belinda Takahashsi and Leila Gerstein and puppeteered by
Murphy - A caterpillar who is Juno's friend. He plays the bassoon. Voiced by Adam Adelman and puppeteered by
Buzz - A bee who is Juno's friend. He plays the flute. Voiced by Adam Adelman and puppeteered by

Juno Baby releases

DVD
Juno's Wonderful Day
Way To Go, Juno! 
Indie’s Great Teddy Bear Hunt 
Juno’s Rhythm Adventure 
One Bunny Band (Juno Jr.) 
The Day the Music Stopped (Juno Jr.)

CD
Juno Baby: Sing Along Edition
Juno Baby: Orchestral Edition
Juno Baby: Super Duper Deluxe Edition!
Juno Baby: Spanish Version
Juno Jr Welcome to Harmonia Springs: Sing Along Edition
Juno Jr Welcome to Harmonia Springs: Orchestral Edition
Juno Jr Welcome to Harmonia Springs: Super Duper Deluxe Edition
Juno Jr Welcome to Harmonia Springs: Spanish Version

iOS
Juno's Musical ABCs (2010)
The Day the Music Stopped (2011)
Juno's Piano (2011)
Juno's Music Learning Adventure (2011)

Awards
source: 
2006 Dr. Toy Top 10 Award
2006 iParenting Media Award
2007 Parent's Choice Award
2007 Creative Child Preferred Choice Award
2007 Emmy Award Winner – Best Original Music
2010 Emmy Award Winner – Best Original Music and Best Children's Program
2010 NAPPA Gold Award
National Parenting Publications Awards – Gold NAPPA Award 
2007 Telly Award, Way to Go, Juno!

Books
 Juno's Musical ABCs
 The Day the Music Stopped

Other products
 Apparel line of the Juno Baby characters
 Plush line of the Juno Baby characters

Business
The founders sold Juno Baby, LLC in 2009 and was renamed The Juno Company, Inc.  The founders continued to work with the company for two more years building out the brand Juno Jr.

After new ownership took on too much debt and pushed the company into bankruptcy, the founders re-purchased the assets in 2012.

Television
Juno Baby and Juno Jr. was reinstated for broadcast on BabyFirst TV on 31 March 2014, after a nearly one-year hiatus. but stopped airing it in 2015 and removed it from their website and was replaced by Honk, Toot & Swoo-Swoosh.

References

External links 

 Official website

Toy companies of the United States